The K III class was a class of two patrol submarines, built by Koninklijke Maatschappij De Schelde in Vlissingen for the Royal Netherlands Navy. Used for patrols in the Dutch colonial waters. The design for the double hulled boats came from the American Electric Boat Company.

Construction

External links
Description of class